The following lists events that happened during 2004 in Republic of Albania.

Incumbents 
 President: Alfred Moisiu
 Prime Minister: Fatos Nano

Events

February 
 Opposition stages angry demonstration in Tirana to demand Mr Nano's resignation and protest against government failure to improve living standards.

May 

 In its first appearance in the competition, Albania is represented at the Eurovision Song Contest 2004 by Anjeza Shahini, who places 7th with the song "The Image of You".

July 
 July 17: Susan of Albania, wife of the pretender Leka, Crown Prince of Albania, dies of lung cancer in Tirana.

September 
 September 4: The political party Socialist Movement for Integration is formed by former prime minister Ilir Meta.

December 
 Edi Rama, Mayor of Tirana elected World Mayor 2004.

See also
 2004 in Albanian television

References 

 
Years of the 21st century in Albania
2000s in Albania